Antonio Attanasio (2 January 1950 – 28 December 1982) was an Italian swimmer. He competed in the 100 m butterfly and 4×100 m medley relay events at the 1968 Olympics, but failed to reach the finals. He died aged 32 in a traffic accident.

References

1950 births
1982 deaths
Italian male butterfly swimmers
Swimmers at the 1968 Summer Olympics
Olympic swimmers of Italy
Road incident deaths in Italy